Naoki Maeda may refer to:

Naoki Maeda (composer) (born 1969), Japanese composer
Naoki Maeda (footballer, born 1994), Japanese footballer
Naoki Maeda (footballer, born 1996), Japanese footballer